Sclater's myzomela (Myzomela sclateri) or the scarlet-bibbed myzomela, is a species of bird in the family Meliphagidae. It is endemic to Papua New Guinea (Karkar and smaller islands). Its natural habitats are subtropical or tropical moist lowland forests and subtropical or tropical moist montane forests.

References

Sclater's myzomela
Birds of Papua New Guinea
Sclater's myzomela
Taxonomy articles created by Polbot